Anton Olegovich Shvets (born 26 April 1993) is a footballer who plays for Akhmat Grozny, as a defensive midfielder. Born in Ukraine, Shvets represents the Russia national football team internationally.

Club career
Born in Ukraine to a Ukrainian father and a Georgian mother, Shvets moved to Georgia at early age, and later moved to Russia. In September 2010 he went on a trial at Real Zaragoza, but could not sign with the club due to his age; he later returned to Russia and joined FC Spartak Moscow's youth setup.

In the 2011 summer Shvets returned to Zaragoza, being assigned to the Juvenil squad. He made his senior debuts with Zaragoza's reserves in the 2011–12 campaign, appearing rarely in Segunda División B.

On 23 March 2014 Shvets played his first match as a professional, coming on as a late substitute in a 0–1 home loss against Deportivo de La Coruña in the Segunda División championship. On 19 June he moved to another reserve team, Villarreal CF B also in the third level.

On 1 July 2017, he signed a 4-year contract with the Russian Premier League club FC Akhmat Grozny. On 5 December 2022, Shvets extended his contract with Akhmat until the end of the 2025–26 season.

International career
In March 2013, Shvets was called up to Georgia under-21's, but refused to link up with the squad, committing himself to Russia. He played his first full international for his country on 27 March 2018 against France, replacing Alexandr Yerokhin, the game Russia lost with a score of 1–3.

On 11 May 2018, he was included in Russia's extended 2018 FIFA World Cup squad as a back-up, but was excluded from the final list.

Career statistics

Club

References

External links

1993 births
Living people
Russian footballers
Russia international footballers
Russian sportspeople of Georgian descent
Ukrainian emigrants to Russia
Association football midfielders
Segunda División players
Segunda División B players
Tercera División players
Real Zaragoza B players
Real Zaragoza players
Villarreal CF B players
Russian expatriate footballers
Expatriate footballers in Spain
FC Akhmat Grozny players
Russian Premier League players
Sportspeople from Kherson Oblast